Flora is an extinct town in Meigs County, in the U.S. state of Ohio. The GNIS classifies it as a populated place.

History
A post office was established at Flora in 1884, and remained in operation until 1949. An early settler gave the community the name of his daughter Flora.

References

Ghost towns in Ohio
Landforms of Meigs County, Ohio